Selenocystine is the amino acid with the formula .  It is the oxidized derivative of the canonical amino acid selenocysteine. The compound can also be prepared synthetically from serine. Because selenocysteine is not easily isolated or handled, it is often generated by reduction of selenocystine in situ. The selenium-selenium bond length is 2.321 Å, which is 14% longer than the disulfide bond in cystine at 2.040 Å.

References

Amino acids
Proteinogenic amino acids
Organoselenium compounds